Boundary Break is a YouTube series hosted by Derek, better known as Internet personality Shesez. In the series, Shesez explores locations normally unaccessible in video games by using unofficial virtual camera mods. The series started on April 27, 2016, with an episode exploring Super Smash Bros. Brawl. During its run, the show has made multiple notable discoveries in its covered games, including Animal Crossing: New Horizons, Star Wars Jedi: Fallen Order, P.T., Shovel Knight, Grand Theft Auto V, Untitled Goose Game, The Simpsons: Hit & Run, and Mario Kart 8. For certain episodes, Shesez has spoken with people involved with the development of the covered games, including Kyle Pittman, a programmer for Borderlands 2, and David D'Angelo, a programmer for Shovel Knight.

Shesez 
Shesez was born Derek Mish on November 19, 1994 to Patricia Mish and Peter Mish. After gaining a following online, he is now known as Derek Forte; Forte is Patricia's maiden name.

In 2018, Forte started a GoFundMe page to fund an air lift for his father, who had complications with pneumonia. Though the fundraising goal was met an hour later, he died before he could be lifted. His mother died the same year.

Forte is engaged to KC Delk. He is the stepfather of Delk's daughter.

Reception 
Boundary Break's creator and host, Shesez, was nominated for a Shorty Award in the Gaming category for his work on the series, where he was a finalist. Kotaku's Zack Zwiezen praised the Boundary Break episode covering Lego Star Wars: The Video Game, calling it his favorite episode of the series.

References

External links 
 

2010s YouTube series
2020s YouTube series
Works about video games
2016 web series debuts
YouTube channels launched in 2013